FF Sport Nova Cruz is a Brazilian football club based in Atalaia, Alagoas. It competes in the Campeonato Alagoano Segunda Divisão, the second division of the Alagoas state football league.

Founded as Sport Club Comercial in Viçosa on 6 June 1965, their uniform originally was a yellow jersey with green details, blue shorts, and white socks with yellow and green stripes, similar to Brazil's strip. The teams mascot is a canary and their stadium is Teotônio Vilela, which as a capacity of 10,000.

History
Founded in 1965 as Comercial Futebol Clube, the club changed name to Futebol Clube Comercial de Viçosa in 2012. In May 2021, after a partnership with FF Sport, the club again changed name to Sport Club Comercial.

References

Association football clubs established in 1965
Football clubs in Alagoas
1965 establishments in Brazil